Ranmoor/Endcliffe is a development of student accommodation for the University of Sheffield, located in Endcliffe in west Sheffield between Fulwood Road, Endcliffe Vale Road and Westbourne Road. The village accommodates most of the University's first year undergraduates, alongside some second and third years, postgraduates and student families.

The site includes buildings with a long history as student residences (Stephenson Hall, Crewe Flats, Halifax Hall) and several new apartment buildings, typically 4-5 storeys high. Construction of these blocks began in 2006, after the demolition of Sorby Hall and Earnshaw Hall and was completed with the addition of the redevelopment of Ranmoor House, now known as the Ranmoor Village.

Of the new apartment blocks, the two largest are known as Howden and Derwent. All of the apartment blocks are named after climbing crags in the Peak District of Derbyshire. At the centre of the Endcliffe Student Village is The Edge, a two-storey dining hall, bar and IT centre that contains staff offices and staff conference facilities.

References

External links
 Map of the developments at Endcliffe and Ranmoor when complete in PDF format

University of Sheffield
Halls of residence in the United Kingdom